Vietorchis is a genus of myco-heterotrophic flowering plants in the orchid family, Orchidaceae. It contains only one known species, Vietorchis aurea, endemic to northern Vietnam.

See also 
 List of Orchidaceae genera

References

External links 

Orchids of Vietnam
Monotypic Orchidoideae genera
Orchideae genera
Myco-heterotrophic orchids
Orchideae